Phyllostachys mannii  is a species of bamboo found in Guizhou, Henan, Jiangsu, Shaanxi, Sichuan, Xizang, Yunnan, Zhejiang provinces of China, Myanmar, and India.

References

External links
 
 

mannii
Flora of China